České Budějovice District is a district in the South Bohemian Region of the Czech Republic. Its capital is the city of České Budějovice.

Administrative division
České Budějovice District is divided into three administrative districts of municipalities with extended competence: České Budějovice, Trhové Sviny and Týn nad Vltavou.

List of municipalities
Cities and towns are marked in bold and market towns in italics:

Adamov -
Bečice -
Borek -
Borovany -
Borovnice -
Boršov nad Vltavou -
Bošilec -
Branišov -
Břehov -
Čakov -
Čejkovice -
Čenkov u Bechyně -
České Budějovice -
Chotýčany -
Chrášťany -
Čížkrajice -
Dasný -
Dívčice -
Dobrá Voda u Českých Budějovic -
Dobšice -
Dolní Bukovsko -
Doubravice -
Doudleby -
Drahotěšice -
Dražíč -
Dříteň -
Dubičné -
Dubné -
Dynín -
Habří -
Hartmanice -
Heřmaň -
Hlavatce -
Hlincová Hora -
Hluboká nad Vltavou -
Homole -
Horní Kněžeklady -
Horní Stropnice -
Hosín -
Hosty -
Hradce -
Hranice -
Hrdějovice -
Hůry -
Hvozdec -
Jankov -
Jílovice -
Jivno -
Kamenná -
Kamenný Újezd -
Komařice -
Kvítkovice -
Ledenice -
Libín -
Libníč -
Lipí -
Lišov -
Litvínovice -
Ločenice -
Mazelov -
Mladošovice -
Modrá Hůrka -
Mokrý Lom -
Mydlovary -
Nákří -
Nedabyle -
Neplachov -
Nová Ves -
Nové Hrady -
Olešnice -
Olešník -
Ostrolovský Újezd -
Petříkov -
Pištín -
Planá -
Plav -
Radošovice -
Římov -
Roudné -
Rudolfov -
Sedlec -
Ševětín -
Slavče -
Srubec -
Staré Hodějovice -
Štěpánovice -
Strážkovice -
Střížov -
Strýčice -
Svatý Jan nad Malší -
Temelín -
Trhové Sviny -
Týn nad Vltavou -
Úsilné -
Včelná -
Vidov -
Vitín -
Vlkov -
Vrábče -
Vráto -
Všemyslice -
Záboří -
Žabovřesky -
Zahájí -
Žár -
Závraty -
Žimutice -
Zliv -
Zvíkov

Geography

It borders Austria in the southeast. The majority of the territory is hilly with a slightly undulating landscape, the central part of the district consists of a relatively flat landscape, which in the southeast passes into the foothills. The territory extends into five geomorphological mesoregions: Tábor Uplands (north), Třeboň Basin (east), České Budějovice Basin (east), Gratzen Mountains Foothills (south) and Gratzen Mountains (southeast).

The most important river is the Vltava, which flows from southwest to north. Another significant rivers are the Malše (tributary of the Vltava) and Stropnice (tributary of the Malše). The area of the České Budějovice and Třeboň basins is known for its fishponds, which includes some of the large ponds in the country. An important body of water is also Římov Reservoir.

Small parts of the Třeboňsko Protected Landscape Area extends into the district in the east.

Demographics

Most populated municipalities

Economy
České Budějovice is the economic centre of the entire South Bohemian Region. All the largest employers with its headquarters in České Budějovice District and at least 500 employers have their seat in České Budějovice. The largest of these companies with at least 1,000 employers are:

The city of České Budějovice is also well-known for Budweiser Budvar Brewery.

A facility of national importance is the Temelín Nuclear Power Station, one of two nuclear power stations in the country.

Transport
The D3 motorway, part of European route E55, leads from Prague to České Budějovice and further continues as the I/3 road to the Czech-Austrian border.

Sights

The village of Holašovice was designated a UNESCO World Heritage Site in 1998 because of its exceptional preservation of a traditional Baroque-era village.

The most important monuments in the district, protected as national cultural monuments, are:
Preserved sections of the Budweis–Linz Horse-Drawn Railway
Birthplace of Jan Žižka in Trocnov
Hluboká Castle and the Ohrada Castle
Nové Hrady Castle
Fishponds of the Třeboň Basin (partially)
Pilgrimage complex with the Church of the Holy Spirit and Loreto Chapel of Santa Casa in Římov
Set of Passion chapels in Římov

The best-preserved settlements and landscapes, protected as monument reservations and monument zones, are:

České Budějovice (monument reservation)
Holašovice (monument reservation)
Malé Chrášťany (monument reservation)
Mazelov (monument reservation)
Plástovice (monument reservation)
Záboří (monument reservation)
Nové Hrady
Trhové Sviny
Týn nad Vltavou
Bavorovice
Bošilec
Božejov
Břehov
Dobčice
Dynín
Kojákovice
Lipanovice
Munice
Opatovice
Rožnov
Vitín
Zbudov
Novohradsko landscape
Římovsko landscape

The most visited tourist destinations are the Ohrada Zoo in Hluboká nad Vltavou, Hluboká Castle, and Dvorec Zoo in Borovany.

References

External links

České Budějovice District profile on the Czech Statistical Office's website

 
Districts of the Czech Republic